Thermoniphas kamitugensis is a butterfly in the family Lycaenidae. It is found in Kivu in the Democratic Republic of the Congo.

References

Butterflies described in 1945
Thermoniphas
Endemic fauna of the Democratic Republic of the Congo